Manoel "Manny" R. Cruz (born May 20, 1970, in Minas Gerais, Brazil) is a jockey in American Thoroughbred horse racing.

He has won multiple graded stakes races, including four grade II level races.

For every year since 2003, he has finished in the top 15 jockeys at Gulfstream Park.

Manny Cruz has over 2,800 career wins.

Manny Cruz resides in Miami, Florida.

External links
Manoel "Manny" Cruz Facebook page

References

1970 births
Living people
American jockeys
Brazilian jockeys
Brazilian expatriates in the United States